Pasquotank County High School is a school in Elizabeth City, Pasquotank County, North Carolina, USA. PCHS's mascot is the Panther. Its school colors are navy blue and silver. It is one of three high schools in the Elizabeth City-Pasquotank Public Schools system; the other (sometimes considered a rival) is Northeastern High School. PCHS was established in 2000 to relieve the population of Northeastern High; however, all members of the senior class of 2001 remained at Northeastern, making the class of 2002 the first graduating class of Pasquotank County High. The class of 2004 was the first group of students to start at the school as freshmen and graduate from there, spending all four years as PCHS Panthers.

Campus
The school is in a complex with two other schools, the new ECMS (Elizabeth City Middle School) building, and Northside Elementary School. Serving a total student population of 4,102

Administration history

Patti Hamler (2000–2007)
Patti Hamler was the first Principal at PCHS opening the school in 2000. Hamler was the Elizabeth City-Pasquotank Public Schools Principal of the Year for 2003. Hamler left to become principal of Leesville Road Middle School in Wake County, North Carolina at the conclusion of the 2006–07 school year.

Cynthia Morris (2007–08)
Cynthia Morris, who was an Assistant Principal at PCHS, served as interim principal for the Fall 2007 semester. In June 2008 it was announced that Morris would become the principal at Elizabeth City Middle School.

Amy Fyffe (2008–2017)
Amy Fyffe was named school principal at Pasquotank County High School beginning with the Spring 2008 semester. She was formerly a teacher and assistant principal at Northeastern High School. Fyffe was named the 2011 Elizabeth City-Pasquotank Public Schools principal of the year. At the end of the 2016–2017 school year it was announced that Fyffe would take up the principal position at the newly established Elizabeth City-Pasquotank Public Schools early college located on the campus of College of the Albemarle

Brian Ruffin (August 2017–November 2017)
Brian Ruffin was named school principal at Pasquotank County High School beginning with the Fall 2017 semester. He is coming to Pasquotank County High School from Hertford County Early College High School in Ahoskie, where he was school principal. He was removed from the position near the end of the Fall 2017 semester. It was reported that he was on "Self-Selective Sick leave"

Sports

The school offers baseball, football, volleyball, track and field, tennis, golf, basketball, wrestling, soccer, and many other sports. The volleyball made it to the third round of the playoffs in 2010.

School clubs
The school offers the clubs: Future Business Leaders of America, Family, Career, and Community Leaders of America, Future Farmers of America, National Honors Society, Drama Club, and many more.

References

External links
 

Public high schools in North Carolina
Schools in Pasquotank County, North Carolina